The women's 100 metres at the 1954 European Athletics Championships was held in Bern, Switzerland, at Stadion Neufeld on 26 and 27 August 1954.

Medalists

Results

Final
27 August

Semi-finals
27 August

Semi-final 1

Semi-final 2

Heats
26 August

Heat 1

Heat 2

Heat 3

Heat 4

Heat 5

Heat 6

Participation
According to an unofficial count, 31 athletes from 15 countries participated in the event.

 (2)
 (1)
 (3)
 (2)
 (1)
 (3)
 (1)
 (2)
 (2)
 (3)
 (3)
 (1)
 (3)
 (3)
 (1)

References

100 metres
100 metres at the European Athletics Championships
Euro